Rathkarawwais a village in Welimada Divisional Secretariat in  Badulla District, Sri Lanka with a population of about 1000. The nearest city to Rathkarawwa is Haputale, which is about 10 km in distance. Rathkarawwa is surrounded by Welimada, Haputale and Diyatalawa towns.  Paddy and vegetable cultivation had been the main source of income for many families for decades.

Population
The majority of the population are Sinhala Buddhist.
 (Source Welimada Divisional Secretariat 2008-statistics)

Climate
Rathkarawwa belongs to the dry zone of Sri Lanka where less amount of rain is received throughout the year. The average temperature is 24 degrees Celsius during day time.

Transport
134 is the main bus root number between Haputale and Welimada. 228 is the bus route between Boralanda and Bandarawela.

The nearest Railway station is at Haputale on the branch railway to Badulla.

Postal Service
 Rathkarawwa Sub Post Office (Postal Code 90164)

Schools
B/Rathkarawwa Maha Vidyalaya
B/Maligatenna Vidyalaya
B/Gambedda Vidyalaya

Places of worship
Ratnayake Mudalindaramaya Temple Rathkarawwa
Sri Dhammarakkitharamaya

Notable people
 Rathkarawwe Medhananda Thero

See also
Towns in Uva

References

Populated places in Badulla District
Populated places in Uva Province